Oudendijk can refer to several villages in the Netherlands: 

 Oudendijk, Korendijk, in the municipality of Hoeksche Waard, South Holland
 Oudendijk, Strijen, in the municipality of Hoeksche Waard, South Holland
 Oudendijk, North Holland, in the municipality of Koggenland
 Oudendijk, North Brabant, in the municipality of Altena, North Brabant